Caribarctia cardinalis is a moth in the subfamily Arctiinae first described by Douglas Campbell Ferguson in 1985. It can be found in the Dominican Republic.

References

Arctiinae
Moth genera
Moths of the Caribbean